Rahim Beyglui-ye Bala (also Romanized as Raḩīm Beyglūī-ye ‘Olyā; also known as Raḩīm Beyglū-ye Bālā) is a village in Arshaq-e Markazi Rural District, Arshaq District, Meshgin Shahr County, Ardabil Province, Iran. At the 2006 census, its population was 101, in 26 families.

References 

Towns and villages in Meshgin Shahr County